Bandpey (also Romanized as Band Pī) is a village in Kheyrud Kenar Rural District, in the Central District of Nowshahr County, Mazandaran Province, Iran. At the 2006 census, its population was 1,447, in 376 families.

band e pay jungle is the most beautiful jungles that the local people called it noshahr tape(Persian:نوشهرتپه)

References 

Populated places in Nowshahr County